Club Baths was a chain of gay bathhouses in the United States and Canada with particular prominence from the 1960s through the 1990s.

At its peak it included 42 bathhouses: Akron, Atlanta, Atlantic City, Baltimore, Boston, Buffalo, Camden NJ, Chicago, Cleveland (two locations), Columbus Ohio, Dallas, Dayton, Detroit, Hartford, Houston, Indianapolis, Jacksonville, Kansas City, Missouri, Key West, Los Angeles, Miami, Milwaukee, Minneapolis ("opening soon"), New Haven ("opening soon"), New York, Newark, New Jersey, Philadelphia, Phoenix, Pittsburgh, Providence, St. Louis, San Francisco, Tampa, Toledo, Ohio, Washington, DC, London Ontario, and Toronto.

The chain claimed to have at least 500,000 members. Most of the bathhouses were closed in the 1990s either by government agencies or a changing market after charges were made that it contributed to the spread of AIDS.

The Club was founded in 1965 by John W. Campbell (generally known as "Jack") (born 1932) and two other investors who paid $15,000 to buy a closed Finnish bath house in Cleveland, Ohio. Campbell wanted to provide cleaner, brighter amenities which were a contrast to the dark, dirty environment that existed previously.

At one point while encountering Troy Perry, founder of the Metropolitan Community Church, Perry was said to have told him "we have a hundred churches and a total of 30,000 members." Campbell replied, "Well, although we only have thirty churches, we have 300,000 members."

Campbell would be active in the fight against the Save Our Children campaign, headed by Anita Bryant in the late 1970s.

The facility in Toronto, Ontario, was one of four bathhouses raided on February 5, 1981, in a police action known as Operation Soap.

Bathhouses that today claim a Club Baths heritage include the CBC Resorts Club Body Center which has bathhouses in Miami, Florida, Philadelphia, Pennsylvania, and Providence, Rhode Island. and The Clubs which has facilities in Cleveland, Columbus, Fort Lauderdale, Florida, Dallas, Texas, Houston, Texas, Indianapolis, Indiana,  Orlando, Florida, and St. Louis, Missouri.

References

Gay bathhouses in the United States
Culture of Cleveland
LGBT culture in Toronto
Gay culture in Canada
Gay history